Thurø By is the only town located on the island of Thurø of the South Funen Archipelago, in Svendborg Municipality of south-central Denmark.

References 

Cities and towns in the Region of Southern Denmark
Svendborg Municipality